Anders Annerfalk (born 1959 in Sweden) is an aviation author, historian and PR Director. Originally trained as a commissioned officer, he graduated from the Swedish Air Force Academy in 1982. Working initially as an Early Warning officer, he left active status by joining the Swedish Air Force Reserve in 1989. Since then, he has had a civilian career in PR and Communications, including the position as Director of Communications and Public Affairs for SAAB-Aircraft. For a period (2003–2006), he assisted Saab Gripen International in marketing the Gripen Fighter. He has written books on the topics of Saab Scandia and the Saab Safir, as well as on the history of the Swedish Air Force.

Writings
Saab Scandia, Aviatic Förlag AB, 1987, 
Saab Safir, Aviatic Förlag AB, 1991, 
Flygvapnet – En historisk översikt, Aviatic Förlag AB, 1987, 
Från Dronten till Gripen – Flygvapnet 1926–1996, Aviatic Förlag AB, 1996, 
Flygvapnet – An Illustrated History of The Swedish Air Force, Aviatic Förlag AB, 1999,

References

1959 births
Living people
Swedish aviators
Swedish non-fiction writers
Swedish Air Force officers